Majiadian (马家店镇) may refer to the following locations in China:

 Majiadian, Liaoning
 Majiadian, Tianjin, in Baodi District